Tetracha ruth is a species of tiger beetle that was described by W. Horn in 1907.

References

Beetles described in 1907
Cicindelidae